United Airlines is the third largest airline in the world, with 86,852 employees (which includes the entire holding company United Airlines Holdings) and 721 aircraft. It was the brainchild of William Boeing and emerged from his consolidation of numerous carriers and equipment manufacturers from 1928 to 1930.

History

Beginnings
United Airlines was the creation of aviation pioneer William Boeing, who started out in the airplane business in 1916.  His Boeing Airplane Company, as it was then called, achieved the first international postal delivery in 1919, and he went on to establish United Aircraft Corp. in 1928.  It was this UAC that acquired mail and passenger service operator Pacific Air Transport on January 1, 1928, then renamed Boeing Aircraft & Transport Co., merged with Pratt & Whitney Aircraft in early 1929 to form United Aircraft and Transport Corporation (UATC).  UATC acquired America's first scheduled passenger services carrier Stout Air Services on April 29, 1929, the nation's first scheduled service (mail only) operator Varney Air Lines in early 1930, and finally National Air Transport (a large Chicago-based mail-only carrier) on May 7, 1930. On March 28, 1931, UATC formed the corporation United Air Lines, Inc. to manage its airline subsidiaries.  Thus, United Airlines makes the claim to be the oldest commercial airline in the United States by dint of its Varney acquisition.

Varney was founded by Walter Varney in Boise, Idaho. Varney's chief pilot Leon D. "Lee" Cuddeback flew the first contract air mail flight in a Swallow biplane from Varney's Boise headquarters to the railroad mail hub at Pasco, Washington on April 5, 1926, and returned the following day with 200 pounds of mail.  Varney Airlines' original 1925 hangar served as a portion of the terminal building for the Boise Airport until 2003, when the structure was replaced.

Through its string of successful acquisitions, United Air Lines provided coast-to-coast passenger and mail services by 1930.  It took 27 hours to fly the route, one way.  Boeing Air Transport hired registered nurse Ellen Church to assist passengers; United claims Church as the first airline stewardess. In Chicago, United Air Lines hired the first airline dietitian Ella Gertrude McMullen in July 1937.

Following the Air Mail scandal of 1930, the Air Mail Act of 1934 banned the common ownership of manufacturers and airlines. UATC's President Philip G. Johnson was forced to resign and moved to Trans-Canada Airlines, the future Air Canada. UATC was broken into three separate companies. UATC's manufacturing interests east of the Mississippi River became United Aircraft (the future United Technologies), while its manufacturing interests west of the Mississippi became Boeing Airplane Company. The airline interests became United Air Lines. The airline company's new president, hired to make a fresh start as airmail contracts were re-awarded in 1934, was William A. Patterson, who remained as president until 1963.

Expansion into a national carrier

United's early routes, formed by connecting airmail routes, was east-to-west from New York City via Chicago and Salt Lake City to San Francisco, and north–south along the West Coast. The early connections became the basis of United hubs in Chicago and San Francisco, and later in Denver and Washington, D.C.; these remain United's principal hubs.

In 1933, United introduced the Boeing 247; for the first time, passengers could fly across the United States without an overnight stop or changing planes. That summer, the fastest flight left Newark at noon (probably EST) and arrived at San Francisco at 6:55 PST after eight stops; the fare was $160 one-way, equal to $2,868 in today's value.

 
On the night of October 10, 1933, a United Boeing 247 exploded in mid-air and crashed near Chesterton, Indiana, killing seven people aboard. An investigation revealed that the explosion was caused by a nitroglycerin bomb placed in the baggage hold. The incident is believed to be the first proven case of air sabotage in commercial aviation history. No suspects or motives were ever found.

During World War II, United-trained ground crews modified airplanes for use as bombers, and transported mail, material and passengers in support of the war effort.  The airline was busy covering the need for air transport across the United States during the war.  Its fleet of fifty aircraft were utilized at a rate of more than thirteen hours per day by 1945 (well above the pre-war rate of less than nine hours per day), flying 100,000 miles per day. Post-war United benefited from new technologies (such as the pressurized cabin which permitted planes to fly above the weather) and a boom in customer demand for air travel. This was the period during which Pan American Airways revived its Pacific route system that would later be acquired by United.

In 1954, United became the first airline with flight simulators that had visual, sound and motion cues for training pilots.  Purchased for US$3 million (1954) from Curtiss-Wright, these were the first modern simulators for training of commercial pilots.

From 1953 to 1970, United operated six-day-a-week afternoon non-stop extra fare "men only" flights between New York and Chicago ("The Chicago Executive" 642–643) and  Los Angeles and San Francisco (665–666) on which women and children were banned. Advertised as a "club in the sky", they featured "cocktails, steak dinner, and cigar and pipe smoking permitted".

On November 1, 1955, United Airlines Flight 629 was bombed while flying from Stapleton Airport in Denver to Portland, killing all 39 passengers and five crew members on board the Douglas DC-6B. The bomb was planted by Jack Graham, who put the device in his mother's luggage to collect on her life insurance policy. Graham was arrested, tried, and later executed a year after the explosion.

In the late 1950s, three United planes were lost in mid-air collisions that killed everyone on both aircraft involved. On June 30, 1956, Flight 718 collided with a Trans World Airlines Lockheed L-1049 Super Constellation over the Grand Canyon in what was then the world's deadliest commercial airline disaster. On April 21, 1958, Flight 736 crashed in southern Nevada after colliding with a USAF F-100 Super Sabre fighter jet. On December 16, 1960, Flight 826 hit another TWA Super Constellation over New York City.  These accidents helped pave the way for modern Air Traffic Control.  Also, in 1958, United received its first Douglas DC-8, its first jet aircraft.

On June 1, 1961, United merged with Capital Airlines, displacing rival American Airlines as the world's second largest airline behind Aeroflot of the Soviet Union. The merger resulted in United inheriting from Capital the British-manufactured Vickers Viscount, which was the only mainline turboprop aircraft ever flown by the airline. United also began operating French-manufactured Sud Aviation Caravelle jetliners and was the only American-based airline ever to operate the Caravelle in scheduled passenger service.  In 1968, the company reorganized, creating UAL Corporation with United Airlines as a wholly owned subsidiary.

In August 1970, United took delivery of their first Boeing 747s, initially operating them on longer routes within the United States. A year later, United, along with American, were the launch customers for the McDonnell Douglas DC-10, which served as a workhorse in both airlines' fleets and others around the world for many years.

United Airlines is the only airline to have operated Executive One, the designation given to a civil flight carrying the U.S. president. On December 26, 1973, then-president Richard Nixon flew aboard a United DC-10 flight from Washington Dulles to Los Angeles. White House staff explained that this was done to conserve fuel by not having to fly the usual Boeing 707 aircraft used for Air Force One. In keeping with the practice of having two aircraft available at all times during Presidential travel, an Air Force aircraft followed in case of emergency.

In August 1940, United scheduled flights to 37 airports. In August 1953, 66 airports on United and 51 on Capital; United flew to 91 in May 1968, and to 90 in November 1978.

Deregulation

United sought overseas routes in the 1960s, but the 1969 Transpacific Route Case denied it this expansion; it did not gain an overseas route until 1983, when United began flights to Tokyo from Portland and Seattle. United became a proponent of deregulation due to its perception that regulation, as it then existed, was a major constraint on United's ability to profitably grow. After years of focused work to bring about deregulation, the 1978 Airline Deregulation Act became law.

During the 1970s, economic turmoil and the "stagflation" that ensued, as well as labor unrest and the pressures of the 1978 Airline Deregulation Act, greatly hampered the industry and United, which incurred losses at a time when it was also undergoing changes at the top of both United and its parent company UAL Corp. Some changes were due largely to the retirement of long-term senior management members, as well as performance-driven changes at the very top in 1969 and again in 1985 following the pilot strike (discussed below).

In May 1981, a week after rival American Airlines launched AAdvantage, the first modern frequent flyer program, United launched its Mileage Plus.

In 1982, United was the launch carrier for the Boeing 767-200, receiving its first 767-200s on August 19. The launch order for 30 airplanes in 1978, together with an order for 30 727-200s, totaled $1.2 billion, and was the largest commercial airplane order up to that time, eclipsing Pan Am's launch order for the 747.

In 1984, United was the first airline to serve all 50 states with commercial airports when it started flights to Atlanta, Nashville, Memphis, Little Rock, Fargo, Casper, Jackson, and Charleston.

By late 1986, United flew to thirteen Pacific destinations, most of which were purchased from Pan Am.

Strike of 1985
On May 17, 1985, United's pilots went on a 29-day strike, claiming that CEO Richard Ferris was trying to "break the unions." The pilots used management's proposed "B-scale" pilot pay rates as proof. American Airlines already had a non-merging B-scale for its pilots. Ferris insisted United had to have pilot costs no higher than American's, so he offered United pilots a "word-for-word" contract to match American's, or the same bottom-line numbers. The United ALPA-MEC rejected that offer. The only choice left, to achieve parity with American's pilot costs, was to begin a B-scale for United's new-hire pilots.

Ferris wanted that B-scale to merge in the captain's ranks, which was more generous than American's B-scale, which never merged at all. However, the ALPA MEC insisted they merge in the new pilot's sixth-year with the airline. In the final hours before the strike, nearly all issues had been resolved, except for the time length of the B-scale. It appeared that would be resolved too as negotiations continued. Moments before the ALPA announced strike deadline, they began a "countdown of the final 30 seconds from Chicago" (the Odeum teleconference). Doing that made it impossible to extend the strike deadline so that the final issues could be resolved without a strike.

In February 1987, Ferris changed United's parent company's name from UAL Corporation to Allegis, but the name change was short-lived. Following Ferris' termination by the board, Allegis divested its non-airline properties in 1987 and reverted to the UAL Corp. name in May 1988.

Record-setting flight
In 1988, United flew a two-stop around-the-world flight to raise money for the Friendship Foundation using a Boeing 747SP-21 purchased from Pan American World Airways. The flight made a very short-lived record for the fastest flight around the globe; within a month, a Gulfstream IV business jet had broken Friendship One's record.

Employee Stock Ownership Plan

The decline of Pan American World Airways offered opportunities; in 1991, United purchased Pan Am's routes to London Heathrow Airport. In direct negotiations with the British government, United also obtained rights to fly to Heathrow from Chicago. However, the aftermath of the Gulf War and competition from low-cost carriers led to losses of US$332 million in 1991 and US$957 million in 1992. In 1992, United purchased Pan Am's Latin American and Caribbean routes and Miami gates, but allowed months to elapse between Pan Am's demise and its launch of service.

In 1994, United's pilots, machinists, bag handlers, and non-contract employees agreed to acquire 55% of company stock in exchange for 15% to 25% salary concessions. The flight attendants voted not to participate in the deal, and some initially wore buttons saying "we just work here." The Employee Stock Ownership Plan (ESOP) made United the largest employee-owned corporation in the world. United used the opportunity to create the low-cost subsidiary Shuttle by United in an attempt to compete with low-cost carriers.

United used its employee-ownership in its marketing communications, with slogans such as "the employee-owners of United invite you to come fly the friendly skies," "we don't just work here," and "thank you for calling United Airlines; please hold and one of our owner-representatives will be with you shortly."

The financial outcomes of the ESOP were decidedly uneven for different players. As part of ESOP agreement, United CEO Stephen Wolf resigned and took a consulting job with Lazard Freres, the investment company he had hired to advise United's board during the ESOP buyout process. Stewart Oran, the key legal advisor to the pilots' union, received a  package to join the management of the new employee-owned company as legal counsel after the ESOP was formed. Having a larger say in running the company, United's unions later successfully bargained for significant pay increases, but the effect was only short-term. The rank and file employees were locked into their stock, which was wiped out in the eventual bankruptcy.

During this period, United introduced its grey and blue color scheme; however, it was criticized for blending with the darkness during nighttime operations.

Turn-of-the-21st-century developments

In 1989, United ordered the then-new Boeing 747-400. In 1993, United phased out the Saul Bass livery and introduced the "Battleship Gray" livery to their fleet. In 1995, United became both the launch customer of the Boeing 777, having significant input on its design. In 1997, United co-founded the Star Alliance with Air Canada, Lufthansa, Scandinavian Airlines, and Thai Airways. That same year, United opened its southwest US hub at Los Angeles International Airport.

In 1997, Sony engineer John Cooperstock and an assistant professor at McGill University in Montreal, Quebec, created untied.com, a website chronicling complaints about service on United, including those from Premier Class customers. In 2000, Kevin Simpson of the Denver Post said that "the Untied.com phenomenon mirrors the online trend in consumer activism that has caught on with the disgruntled flying public this summer travel season."

In 1998, Delta Air Lines and United introduced a marketing partnership that included a reciprocal redemption agreement between SkyMiles and Mileage Plus programs and shared lounges. This allowed members of either frequent flier program to earn miles on both carriers and utilize both carriers' lounges. Delta and United attempted to form a cozier codeshare relationship, but this deal was effectively killed by ALPA. The marketing partnership ended in divorce in 2003, but paved the way for a future alliance with US Airways.

The offer drew immediate scorn from consumer groups and employees of both airlines. By 2001, the regulatory sentiment was against the deal, and United withdrew the offer just before the Department of Justice barred the merger on antitrust grounds in July. The two airlines subsequently formed an amicable partnership that led to US Airways' entrance into the Star Alliance.

May 2000 also saw a bitter contract dispute between United and its pilots' union. The pilots wanted their pay restored to the levels that existed prior to the pay cuts and concessions that were taken to fund the ESOP. Planning for the busy summer season, United had counted on its pilots flying overtime. However, the pilots could not be forced to work overtime, and most pilots refused to fly the extra hours. Although United knew they would have to cancel numerous flights if this were to happen, they did not hire new pilots to make up for the potential shortage. Over the summer, United had to cancel a large portion of its schedule at its major hubs. Eventually, CEO Jim Goodwin and the rest of the management had to get the pilots back in the cockpits and quickly offered them a 48% increase over four years with up to 28% upfront.

September 11 attacks
During the attacks of September 11, 2001, two of the four planes hijacked were United planes. One aircraft was N612UA, a Boeing 767-222 operating as United Airlines Flight 175, flown into the South Tower of the World Trade Center. The other was N591UA, a Boeing 757-222 operating as United Airlines Flight 93, which crashed in rural Pennsylvania after the passengers fought back against the hijackers, and was suspected to have been directed towards the United States Capitol building, according to the 9/11 Commission.

Bankruptcy and reorganization

With a strong presence on the West Coast, United benefited from the dot-com boom, which boosted traffic (especially premium traffic) to the San Francisco hub. This increase was only temporary, and when the bubble finally burst, United was in a worse position than before because it had failed to keep costs under control, possibly due to giving its pilots pay raises of up to 28% in the summer of 2000. That same year, United applied for a  loan guarantee from
the federal Air Transportation Stabilization Board established in the wake of the 9/11 attacks. When the IAM union failed to approve the loan guarantee—while all other unions approved it—the application was rejected in late 2002, and the company was forced to seek debtor-in-possession financing from commercial sources to cover the expected future losses. United made several attempts to obtain government loans, even enlisting several congressmen and senators for help.

Unable to secure additional capital, UAL Corporation filed for chapter 11 bankruptcy protection in December 2002. The ESOP was terminated, although its shares had become virtually worthless by then. Blame for the bankruptcy fell on 9/11, which triggered the financial crisis in all the major North American airlines, coupled with the economic slowdown that was underway.

United continued operations during its bankruptcy, but was forced to cut its costs drastically. Tens of thousands of workers were furloughed and all city ticket offices were closed in the United States. The airline canceled several existing and planned routes, and eliminated its entire Latin American gateway and flight crew base at Miami International Airport after March 1, 2004. Furthermore, they reduced their mainline fleet from 557 (before 9/11) to 460 aircraft.

At the same time, the airline continued to invest in new projects. On November 12, 2003, it launched Ted, a new low-cost carrier to compete with other low-cost airlines. In 2004, it launched its luxury p.s. service on re-configured Boeing 757-200s from JFK Airport in New York City to Los Angeles and San Francisco. That same year, the airline introduced its "Blue Tulip" livery to its fleet to signify the company's fresh start and emergence from bankruptcy; despite the livery being new, it was never applied to any newly manufactured aircraft, as United did not order or take delivery for any new aircraft during its use. The service was targeted to business customers and high-end leisure customers in the coast-to-coast market. In February 2004, the airline introduced the new blue and white livery, commonly called "Rising Blue", with the Blue Tulip on the tail to coincide with a new advertising campaign.

Financial pressure on the airline was heavy. The 2003 SARS epidemic depressed traffic on United's extensive Pacific network. The spikes in the price of jet fuel ate away the remaining profits United made. United implemented several fare hikes on overseas routes, citing rising fuel costs, in 2004 and 2005. Two days after its triumphant first flight to Vietnam, United announced that it would cut U.S. flight capacity by 14% after the holidays and add more international flights, which were more profitable.

United took advantage of its Chapter 11 status to negotiate hard-to-cut costs with employees, suppliers and contractors, including cancellation of feeder contracts with United Express carriers Atlantic Coast Airlines (which became Independence Air) and Air Wisconsin (which became a US Airways Express carrier). However, the most controversial of all was the 2005 cancellation of its pension plan, the largest such default in American corporate history. It renegotiated its contracts with the pilots' and mechanics' unions and the Association of Flight Attendants for lower pay. Criticism was also leveled at CEO Glenn Tilton for demanding pay cuts from employees while receiving the highest salary of any major U.S. airline CEO.

Originally slated to exit bankruptcy protection after 2½ years in the third quarter of 2005, United requested yet another extension in light of record-high fuel prices. On August 26, 2005, the bankruptcy court extended the airline's exclusive right to file a reorganization plan to November 1, although it also stated firmly this extension would be the last. United announced at the same time that it had raised  in exit financing and filed its Plan of Reorganization, as announced, on September 7, 2005. On January 20, 2006, the bankruptcy court approved the restructuring plan, clearing the way for United to exit bankruptcy on February 1 and finally return to normal operations.

Beyond Chapter 11

On December 9, 2004, the airline made history when UA869, operated by a Boeing 747-400, landed at Ho Chi Minh City (formerly Saigon) in Vietnam. The scheduled flight from San Francisco via Hong Kong (SFO–HKG–SGN) was the first by a U.S. airline since the end of the Vietnam War, when Pan Am halted service shortly before the fall of Saigon in 1975.

On February 1, 2006, United emerged from Chapter 11 bankruptcy protection under which it had operated since December 9, 2002, the largest and longest airline bankruptcy case in the history of the industry. In 2006, United's management called for consolidation in the industry and looked for a suitor. Later that year, The Wall Street Journal revealed that Continental Airlines was in discussions of a merger with United. A deal was not "certain or imminent," with the talks being in a preliminary state. In the interim, it increased its ties with British carrier BMI and Aloha Airlines. In April 2007,
United and BMI announced that they would "effectively merge" their trans-Atlantic operations. The merged operations would have begun in March 2008, but Lufthansa's takeover of BMI preempted the two carrier's plans when BMI's transatlantic flights were terminated. United's acquisition of an equity stake in its longtime partner Aloha Airlines in May 2007 was short-lived, as Aloha ceased operations in March
2008. On June 14, 2007, CFO Jake Brace said the company was still looking to "tie the knot" with a suitable merger partner.

In the years following United's exit from bankruptcy, the financial firms Bank of America and Fidelity Investments accumulated shares to become the second largest owner with an 11 percent stake in the company. The industry environment was ripe with pressures to merge and consolidate. Pardus Capital Management LP, a hedge fund that owned  shares of Delta and  shares of United, called for the two carriers to merge. This action sent shares of both airlines up, but became moot because Delta wedded Northwest.

The surge in jet fuel prices caused disruption to United's impending start of non-stop long-haul services. Though the FAA had already awarded the SFO to Guangzhou to United, they postponed the launch, citing high fuel prices. Other long-haul city pairs, such as its 2009 application to fly between Los Angeles and Shanghai (which began May 2011), were denied by the FAA.

During this time of turmoil brought on by external forces, United explored options to re-establish its financial footing and raise capital. These changes included:
Divesting of the Maintenance, Repair, and Overhaul operations at SFO.
Spinning off the cargo division.
Spinning off the Mileage Plus frequent flier program.

These spin-offs and divestitures have not come to fruition.

In May 2008, the American Customer Satisfaction Index scored United Airlines second-last among American-based airlines in customer satisfaction with a 21% decrease since the study began in 1994 and an 11% decrease over the previous year. On April 27, 2008, it was reported that UAL Corporation and US Airways Group were in the advanced stages of merger negotiations as well. Sources stated that a merger was expected to be announced within two weeks of the report. United pilots vociferously rejected the proposal and vowed to fight it. Star Alliance co-founder and Lufthansa CEO Wolfgang Mayrhuber threw his support behind a marriage of partner carriers United and US Airways.

On June 4, 2008, United announced that it would close its Ted unit and reconfigure it for a return to mainline configuration to compensate for the removal of its Boeing 737s that were to be retired. That retirement plan included s and s, reducing the mainline fleet from 460 to 359 and furthering the airline's goal of cutting domestic capacity by 15 percent. On June 12, 2008, United announced it would charge $15 for the first checked bag, becoming the second U.S. airline to do so, after American Airlines. On June 28, 2008, United announced the cessation of several international routes, including San Francisco to Nagoya and Chicago to Mexico City.

On September 8, 2008, the price of UAL shares fell by nearly 99% in fifteen minutes to $0.01 US amid rumors of another bankruptcy, before NASDAQ temporarily halted trading. The rumors were traced to an old story on the South Florida Sun-Sentinel website about the 2002 bankruptcy being picked up by Google News and subsequently presented by Bloomberg LP as a breaking story. The share price subsequently recovered most of its value.

In January 2009, United announced a code-sharing agreement with Aer Lingus for flights between Washington Dulles and Madrid. Aer Lingus would operate the service, which is permitted under recent open skies agreements between the United States and Europe. In May 2009, the U.S. Department of Transportation rated UAL eleventh among 19 US carriers in lost, damaged, delayed, or pilfered baggage, with 3.67 complaints per 1,000 passengers. In July 2009, the viral music video "United Breaks Guitars" was released about a disputed damaged baggage claim with the airline. United said it wanted to use the video as a staff training tool to help the company improve its internal "corporate culture" relating to its
customer relations in that area of its services.

2008 recession, fuel efficiency issues and new jet orders
In April 2009, United eliminated the ability to call customer service, leaving reservations agents as the only reachable contact for the airline.

In June 2009, United asked manufacturers Boeing and Airbus to submit proposals to sell the airline up to 150 jets in a
winner-take-all competition. United took advantage of declining sales at both plane makers to reap steep price reductions; the large size of this prospective order would also influence pricing.  The Wall Street Journal cited the average ages of four types of jets in United's fleet as follows:
Boeing 747-400 – 13 years
Boeing 777-200ER – 10 years
Boeing 767-300ER – 14 years
Boeing 757-200 – 17 years

Merger with Continental

On April 16, 2010, United resumed merger talks with Continental Airlines. The board of directors of both Continental and UAL Corporation reached an agreement to combine operations to create the world's largest airline on May 2, 2010. The combined carrier would take the United Airlines name but use Continental's logo and livery. The carrier would be headquartered in Chicago, with Continental CEO Jeff Smisek acting as CEO of the combined airline. The merger was contingent upon shareholder and regulatory approval, but was approved by the European Union.

Continental and United Airlines revealed a new logo based on that of Continental, to be used for the post-merger United. On August 27, 2010, the US Justice Department approved the Continental-United merger, partially due to the fact that the two airlines agreed to lease 18 take-off and 18 landing slots at Newark Liberty International Airport to Southwest Airlines. On September 17, 2010, United shareholders approved the merger deal with Continental. Both carriers planned to
begin merging operations in 2011 to form the world's biggest carrier, and expected to receive a single operating certificate by late 2011. The merged airline would use Continental's single operating certificate (SOC) (using the "United" name), while those of United and Air Micronesia would be surrendered. On the other hand, the merged airline would use United's maintenance certificate and allow Continental's maintenance certificate to lapse.

On October 1, 2010, UAL Corporation completed its acquisition of Continental Airlines, and changed its name to United Continental Holdings, Inc. The two airlines remained separate until the operational integration was completed in mid-2012. United and Continental announced that United Mileage Plus would be the remaining frequent flyer program of the two airlines. The airline received a single operating certificate from the FAA on November 30, 2011.

On March 31, 2013, United and Continental merged into a single airline. The integration of the two airlines was structured so that Continental would be the surviving corporate entity and a wholly owned subsidiary of UAL Corporation. Continental then changed its name to United Airlines, Inc. The merged airline opted to retain the United name in order to conserve the built-in brand equity of pre-merger legacy United Airlines.

2013 fine
The United States Department of Transportation fined United $1.1 million for lengthy tarmac delays at O'Hare International Airport in July 2012. It was the largest fine yet for leaving passengers stuck on planes. The fine was for 13 flights carrying a total of 939 passengers delayed longer than three hours during severe thunderstorms and lightning on July 13, 2012. Some flights were as little as two minutes over the limit, but one was held for 4 hours and 17 minutes. Two United Express regional flights had inoperable lavatories during part of the delays.

2015 grounding of flights 
On June 2, 2015, all United Airlines flights were grounded. On July 8, all United flights were grounded again for over two hours after a computer glitch that was blamed on a router failure.

2017 passenger removal controversy 

On April 9, 2017, Dr. David Dao was bloodied and forcibly removed from United Express Flight 3411, sustaining injuries in the process. After the plane had been fully boarded, four members of staff presented themselves for the flight. The company offered compensation to seated passengers to give up their seats but had no volunteers, and four selected passengers were then told to leave the plane. Dao refused this instruction and law enforcement officers were called. The incident was recorded on video by several passengers and officials, and the resultant publicity and subsequent handling of the incident by United Airlines was a PR disaster.

2018 planned growth through 2020 
In January 2018, United stated that it planned to grow its company by adding between 4% and 6% to its passenger capacity and maintain that growth through 2020; this news caused all U.S. airline stocks to fall in value.
Also, United applied for more routes to Tokyo Haneda Airport, from its 6 U.S. hubs that did not fly there. Most of these hubs would replace the Tokyo Narita route with Haneda.

2020: COVID-19 
As a result of the COVID-19 pandemic, in July 2020, United announced that it will be sending lay-off notice warnings to 36,000 employees including, 15,100 flight attendants, 11,000 in airport operations and 2,250 pilots among others. On September 2, 2020, United Airlines, in a new memo to its employees, indicated that they planned to cut 16,370 jobs in nearly a month. The planned involuntary cuts included 6,920 flight attendants, 2,850 pilots, 1,400 management jobs, 2,010 mechanics and 2,260 in airport operations, among others. In November 2020, United Airlines Holdings Inc. started manning flights to position shipments of Pfizer's COVID-19 vaccine in the event that the shots are approved by the FDA and other regulators worldwide. The Federal Aviation Administration has stated it will allow United shipments of 15,000 pounds of dry ice per flight, a measure taken to ensure the vaccine does not spoil, which is five times more than normally permitted.

In contrast to other US airlines, United didn't retire any planes during the pandemic. In June 2021, United announced an order for 270 narrowbody planes, the largest in its history, in an effort to both revitalize its aging fleet and grow its capacity. The order was split between Boeing and Airbus: 150 737 MAX 10s, 50 MAX 8s, and 70 A321neos. It also plans to upgrade its entire existing mainline narrowbody fleet with new interiors, faster WiFi, and seatback entertainment by 2025. In December 2022, United placed another order for 100 787s, for the purpose of replacing the 767s and older 777-200s. Kirby stated that he anticipates and aims for United Airlines becoming the flag carrier of the United States.

As of mid-August 2021, United was the only major United States airline to require COVID-19 vaccines for their workers by October 25, 2021.

Predecessors
United Airlines is a combination of a number of air carriers that have merged with each other starting in the 1930s, with the most recent being Continental Airlines (which had previously merged with or acquired several airlines during its history) thus reflecting changes in focus of both United and the U.S. air transport market.

United was originally formed in 1931 from a merger of four airlines:
 Boeing Air Transport (formed in 1927)
 National Air Transport (formed in 1925)
 Pacific Air Transport (formed in 1926)
 Varney Air Lines (formed in 1926)

Other predecessor air carriers that form the present United Airlines include:

 Capital Airlines (formed in 1936, acquired by United Airlines in 1961)
 Continental Airlines (formed in 1934, merged with United in 2010)
 Air Micronesia (formed in 1968 as a division of Continental Airlines, later became Continental Micronesia and merged into Continental Airlines in 2010)
 New York Air (formed in 1980, merged into Continental Airlines in 1987)
 Pioneer Airlines (formed in 1939, merged into Continental Airlines in 1955)
 People Express Airlines (PEOPLExpress) (formed in 1981, merged into Continental Airlines in 1987)
 Frontier Airlines (formed in 1950, merged into People Express Airlines in 1986)
 Arizona Airways (formed in 1942, merged into Frontier Airlines in 1950)
 Central Airlines (formed in 1949, merged into Frontier Airlines in 1967)
 Challenger Airlines (formed in 1941, merged into Frontier Airlines in 1950)
 Monarch Airlines (formed in 1946, merged into Frontier Airlines in 1950)
 Texas International Airlines (formed in 1944 as Trans-Texas Airways (TTa), Continental Airlines merged into Texas Air in 1982, with Texas Air changing its name to Continental)
 Pan American World Airways (Pan Am) (Formed in 1927, Pacific Division acquired by and merged into United in 1985, Heathrow Airport international traffic rights acquired by and merged into United in 1990. Pan Am was later forced to declare bankruptcy in 1991)

Many of these acquisitions and mergers were completed by Continental Airlines when this carrier was under the ownership and control of Texas Air Corporation from 1982 to 1987. During that time period, New York Air and Texas International Airlines (which were already owned by Texas Air Corporation before this company acquired Continental) were merged into Continental. Texas Air Corporation subsequently acquired PEOPLExpress Airlines (which had previously acquired Frontier Airlines) and then folded these air carriers into Continental as well. As for United, before merging with Continental it had acquired Capital Airlines in the 1960s and had also purchased Pan Am's Pacific Division as well as Pan Am's transatlantic route rights into Heathrow Airport during the 1980s.

Brand history

Historical logos

United adopted a red, white and blue shield logo in 1936, but its use varied widely and was eventually abandoned altogether in the early 1970s. Before 1974 and after the use of the shield logo was discontinued, United advertisements and signage usually advertised to customers to "Come Fly the Friendly Skies of United" in a font identical to the "United" font on the "Friendship" livery of the early 1970s.

In 1973, the airline commissioned designer Saul Bass to develop a new logo and livery. At the time, there was no real logo for the airline and Bass noted that the brand direction was not clearly evident. The "tulip" logo of colored stripes representing overlapping letter "U"s was in use beginning 1974, with only slight modification, until the Continental merger. Among employees at the time there was a suggestion that it was a double-U, i.e. "W", in recognition that United's acquisition of the Westin hotel chain had actually been the reverse, as Westin's president Ed Carlson had become United's CEO. The "Rainbow" (or "Saul Bass") livery, which was the first to feature the "tulip", had a primarily white fuselage, with red, orange and blue stripes along the "cheatline". This livery remained in use for 19 years, with a slight update in 1988 that moved the colored stripes further down the fuselage to allow the "UNITED" font to be larger than before. Marketing during this time continued the "Fly the Friendly Skies" slogan, and it was during this era that United acquired the rights to use Gerswhin's "Rhapsody in Blue", which started to be heard in broadcast advertisements. Other than the re-introduction in 1979 of the single word "AIRLINES" (once again appearing as "UNITED AIRLINES") in advertising and printed materials, the Bass branding would remain until early 1993.

At the request of then-CEO Stephen Wolf, in 1993 United completely revised its branding and livery, with the collaboration of CKS Group, to a primarily grey and dark blue fuselage, with blue stripes on the tail. A custom Times New Roman font, reading "UNITED AIRLINES" in white, replaced Saul Bass's previous lettering style. The familiar "tulip" logo remained, although slightly smaller. As a homage to the previous livery, narrow red, orange and blue stripes appeared between the grey and the dark blue. This so-called "Battleship" livery was intended to project a more business-like, global image for the airline, which was rapidly expanding internationally. Indeed, the words "Worldwide Service" were displayed near the front of the aircraft. Naturally, signage and printed materials reflected the change, often using the light blue on dark blue striped design of the aircraft tail-fin, along with the newly updated font and, of course, the "tulip."

In 1997, United commissioned Pentagram to update the brand. Pentagram soon decided to keep the "tulip", in view of its strong brand-recognition. Pentagram designed a new "UNITED" font that appeared in advertisements, signage and printed material, but did not appear on the aircraft themselves until United's next livery re-design. This arrived on February 18, 2004, when the "Rising Blue" (or "Blue Tulip") livery was introduced, intended to signal a fresh start once the company emerged from bankruptcy protection. As it turned out, United's bankruptcy took longer to resolve than expected; consequently the new branding was actually launched two years sooner. The fresh livery featured a white upper fuselage, replacing the dark grey of the previous design, and used a lighter shade of blue for the aircraft belly, tail and engines. In an echo of the previous two liveries, a series of progressively lighter blue lateral stripes lay between the white upper fuselage and the blue of the aircraft underside. The aircraft tail-fin featured an enlarged and cropped version of the "tulip," shaded with a bluish tint.

On May 3, 2010, it was announced that United and Continental Airlines would merge. The combined airline took the United name but used the Continental Airlines "globe" identity and livery, designed in 1991 by the Lippincott company.

Mark Bergsrud, the head of the new United Airlines's marketing department, said that the new logo reflected United's worldwide network and the airline's efforts to attract corporate clients. Bergsrud said, "It fits who we are. We are not a niche player like Hawaiian, whose livery reflects the islands. Having some local flair is harder for an airline like us. Do we want to stand out? Absolutely. But spiffy liveries just have to fall to a lower level of priority." After United announced its new logo, supporters of the previous United logo started a Facebook group called "Save the United Airlines Tulip" in order to convince the airline to change its logo back to the stylized U, or "tulip." The decision was also said to be unpopular with many marketing experts and graphic designers, claiming that the "tulip" had stronger brand recognition and was a stronger mark than the Continental globe. Much criticism was directed at CEO Jeff Smisek, who flatly admitted that he and former United CEO Glenn Tilton personally came up with the "new" brand and livery themselves, with no outside input or any consulting with either company's marketing departments.

In conjunction with the newly adopted livery, in August 2010 the "United" lettering was updated in accordance with the previous Continental typeface, but presented entirely in upper-case lettering and slightly adjusted to bear a resemblance to United's own previous style. The merger was approved in September 2010, and the two companies merged on October 1, 2010.

United unveiled an updated livery on April 24, 2019.  The new livery retains the white upper fuselage and gray belly. The "United" typeface is larger, there is a blue wavy cheat-line (derived from the modified livery worn by the 787 and 737 MAX fleet), the engines and tail are painted in the same shade of blue as the 2004-2010 livery, and the globe on the tail is slightly enlarged and now in a lighter shade of blue.

Two United aircraft in regular service utilize heritage paint schemes. N75435 is a Boeing 737-900ER acquired in the Continental merger, painted in the 1950s Continental "Blue Skyways" livery since June 2016. Its sister, N75436 also acquired in the Continental merger, was painted in the same livery from June 2009 to April 2016. The other is N475UA, a legacy United Airbus A320 sporting United's 1970s "Stars and Bars" livery. The aircraft was previously painted in Ted colors and also operated with Blue Tulip paint from 2009 to the end of 2010, when it was painted into its current livery.

Another eleven aircraft, including five Boeing 777-200ERs, one Boeing 767-400ER, one Boeing 767-300ER, one Boeing 757-200, two Boeing 737-800s and one Boeing 737-700, are painted in the Star Alliance livery.

Slogans
The early slogan "The Main Line Airway," emphasizing its signature New York-Chicago-San Francisco route, was replaced in 1965 with "Fly the Friendly Skies." The "friendly skies" tagline was used until 1996, yet revived on September 20, 2013. Other United Slogans include:

"The Extra Care Airline (1963–1964)
"When you're friendly you do things for people" (1971)
"The Great Wide Way to New York" (1971–1972)
"Your Land is Our Land" (1972)
"The Friendly Skies of your land" (also known as "Mother Country", 1973–1976)
"You're the boss" (1976–1977), 
"United we fly" (1977–1978)
"United all the way" (1979–1980)
"That's what friendly skies are all about" (1980)
"You're not just flying, you're flying the Friendly Skies" (mid-1980s)
"Official Airline of the 1984 Olympic Games" (1984 Summer Olympics)
"From the ground up, rededicated to giving you the service you deserve. Come fly the friendly skies" (Late 1980s)
"Come fly the airline that's uniting the world. Come fly the Friendly Skies" (late 1980s)
"Come fly our Friendly Skies" (The early ESOP years)
"Airline of the U.S. Olympic Team" (Used during the 1988 Summer Olympics)
"United. Rising." during the late 1990s
"Come fly Chicago's hometown airline. Come fly the friendly skies."
"Feel United ... Be United ... Worlds United ... Stay United ... United" (the late 1990s)
"It's important for the human race to stay United"
"Life is a journeytravel it well; United"
"We Are United" following the September 11 attacks; used until 2004
"Relax, Stretch Out" with the rollout of EconomyPlus
"It's time to fly" (2004–2010)  This was used for the animated commercials (voiced over by Robert Redford), banners, and magazine advertisements of the campaign first unveiled during Super Bowl XXXVIII.  The campaign was reintroduced in August 2008 when United premiered five new TV commercials during the 2008 Summer Olympics.
"Let's fly together" (2010–2013)
"Before they move us, we move them."/"Proud to fly Team USA for over 30 years." (2012–2021) (Used during the 2012 Summer Olympics to promote United as the official airline of the U.S. Olympic Team for more than 30 years. Matt Damon did a voice over for the United Team USA commercials, which premiered during NBC's telecast of the Summer Olympics on July 27, 2012.)
"Fly the Friendly Skies" (2013–present)
"Connecting people. Uniting the world." (2017–present)

Former hubs
Cleveland Hopkins International Airport – United Airlines maintained a secondary East Coast hub at Cleveland until 1985, when it began a move to Washington Dulles. By the time the transition finished in 1987, Continental Airlines had established Cleveland as its fifth hub and first Midwest hub. United maintained the hub for four years following the United-Continental merger. On February 1, 2014, United announced it was dehubbing Cleveland due to lack of profitability and its proximity to the Chicago–O'Hare hub.
Miami International Airport – with the acquisition of Pan Am's international routes from Miami to Europe and Latin America in 1991, Miami became a hub for the airline. In May 2004, MIA was dehubbed and its flights were transferred to Chicago.
Orlando International Airport - United operated a small hub at Orlando in the early 1990s.
John F. Kennedy International Airport – United opened an East Coast hub at JFK in October 1959 with the construction of Terminal 7 (later renumbered Terminal 9). In 1991, United vacated the terminal and became a tenant at Terminal 7, which was owned by British Airways. On October 30, 2000, United and the Port Authority of New York and New Jersey announced that United was going to renovate Terminal 5 as part of a $10 billion expansion project at the airport and use the terminal as their new East Coast hub. These plans were later cancelled as a fallout from the September 11 Attacks, which led to United dehubbing JFK as the demand for airlines dropped.
Portland International Airport – United operated a small hub at PDX from Concourse E. Portland later lost hub status and traffic was moved to San Francisco International Airport.
Seattle-Tacoma International Airport – United Airlines used SeaTac as a hub starting in 1947, when they moved their operations to the airport from Boeing Field. Traffic to the airport was slowly moved to Los Angeles International Airport and San Francisco International Airport during the 1960s and 1970s.
Tokyo Narita International Airport – The ninth-largest hub for both destinations and flights and United's hub for Asia. Narita was the smallest of United's six hubs before the United-Continental merger. In its 2017 Annual Report United no longer listed Tokyo-Narita as a hub.
Stapleton International Airport – Both United and Continental operated hubs at Denver International Airport's predecessor airport, with both hubs active from 1972 until the airport closed in 1995. When Stapleton was replaced with DIA, United transferred operations, but Continental discontinued its Denver hub.

Historical fleet

==References==

Bibliography
 Eastwood A.B. and Roach J.R. Jet Airliner Production List Volume 1 - Boeing. 2003. The Aviation Hobby Shop. .

External links
"Making the World's Largest Airline Fly." BusinessWeek. February 2, 2012.
Untied Airlines  (website critical of United Airlines)

United Airlines
United Airlines
United Airlines
Aviation history of the United States